Animas Air Park  is a privately owned, public use airport located four nautical miles (5 mi, 7 km) south of the central business district of Durango, a city in La Plata County, Colorado, United States.

Facilities and aircraft 
Animas Air Park covers an area of 100 acres (40 ha) at an elevation of 6,684 feet (2,037 m) above mean sea level. It has one runway designated 1/19 with an asphalt surface measuring 5,010 by 50 feet (1,527 x 15 m).

For the 12-month period ending September 1, 2009, the airport had 9,110 aircraft operations, an average of 24 per day: 98.5% general aviation and 1.5% air taxi. At that time there were 48 aircraft based at this airport: 92% single-engine, 6% helicopter, and 2% multi-engine.

References

External links 
 Animas Air Park (00C) at Colorado DOT Airport Directory
 Aerial image as of September 1993 from USGS The National Map
 

Airports in Colorado
Transportation buildings and structures in La Plata County, Colorado